Anthranilate 3-monooxygenase (FAD) (anthranilate 3-hydroxylase, anthranilate hydroxylase) is an enzyme with systematic name anthranilate,FAD:oxygen oxidoreductase (3-hydroxylating). This enzyme catalyses the following chemical reaction

 anthranilate + FADH2 + O2  3-hydroxyanthranilate + FAD + H2O

The enzyme from the bacterium Geobacillus thermodenitrificans participates in tryptophan degradation.

References

External links 
 

EC 1.14.14
Anthranilates